Issa Lish (born May 3, 1995) is a Mexican fashion model. Lish is known for her distinctive look and has been described as jolie laide.

Early life 
In 1995, Lish was born in Mexico City, Mexico. Lish's father is of Japanese descent.

Career
Lish was discovered at age 14 while working at her father's sushi restaurant, a punishment for bad grades at school.

Lish has appeared on the cover of Vogue México, Vogue Italia and Vogue Japan. She is the third Mexican model to be featured on the cover of Vogue Italia - the first being Elsa Benítez and the second, Liliana Domínguez.

Lish has walked on dozens of catwalks, including shows for Prabal Gurung, Céline, Anna Sui and Prada. She was part of the 2014 Fall-Winter Campaign of Balmain. She was part of the Marc Jacobs 2015 Spring Campaign. Lish was part of the 2016 Spring-Summer Campaign of Givenchy. As well as the 2016 Fall-Winter Alexander Wang Campaign.

Personal life  
Lish speaks five languages: Spanish, Japanese, English, French, and Portuguese.

See also
 Japanese community of Mexico City

References

External links
 Issa Lish at Fashion Model Directory

Mexican female models
Mexican people of Japanese descent
People from Mexico City
1995 births
Living people